Spiral Architect is a Norwegian progressive metal band from Oslo. The group formed in 1993 and recorded one demo and one full-length album, A Sceptic's Universe, as well as a Fates Warning cover "A Prelude to Ruin" for the tribute album Through Different Eyes – A Tribute to Fates Warning. Since that time, the various group's members have moved onto other bands and musical projects. Even though the group got together for a couple of songwriting sessions, a second album has never materialized.

Band members

Members 
 Øyvind Hægeland − vocals, backing vocals, keyboards
 Steinar Gundersen − lead, rhythm and acoustic guitars
 Lars K. Norberg − bass, programming
 Asgeir Mickelson − drums

Former members 
 Andreas Jonsson − rhythm guitar
 Kaj Gornitzka − rhythm guitar, backing vocals
 Leif Knashaug − vocals

Discography 
 Spiral Architect (demo) (1995)
 A Sceptic's Universe (2000)

Band name 
In a 2005 post on the band's Ultimate Metal forum by co-founding member Lars K. Norberg, the band name is unrelated to the Black Sabbath song of the same title from their 1973 album Sabbath Bloody Sabbath. Although Norberg claims Black Sabbath is "probably my favourite band ever", according to Norberg the name "reflects the 'spirit' of the band, musically as well as ideologically".

References

External links 
 Official forum

Norwegian progressive metal musical groups
Musical groups established in 1993
1993 establishments in Norway
Musical groups from Oslo